Plaza Sendero is a Mexican Americanized-style chain of shopping malls. The shopping malls usually feature full service restaurants, banks, and clothing stores.

Sendero properties
Sendero properties and major anchors.
Centro Comercial Sendero - General Escobedo, Nuevo Leon (Monterrey)
Soriana
Cinépolis multiplex
Catholic chapel
Las Torres Plaza Comercial - Ciudad Juárez (156,049 m2)
Plaza Periférico - Reynosa (179,042 m2)
Soriana
Cinépolis multiplex
Woolworth
Coppel
GNC
Plaza Sendero - Hermosillo (152,881 m2)
Soriana
Cinépolis
Coppel
Carl's Jr.
GNC
Burger King
Dairy Queen
Julio Cepeda Jugeterias
Woolworth
Plaza Sendero - Matamoros (146,394 m2)
Soriana
Cinépolis multiplex
Famsa
Coppel
Peter Piper Pizza
Carl's Jr.
GNC
Plaza Sendero - Saltillo (149,205 m2)
Soriana
Cimaco
Cinépolis
Toks
Peter Piper Pizza
Subway
Famsa
Coppel
Burger King
Julio Cepeda Jugueterias
GNC
Nutrisa
Plaza Sendero - Querétaro (128,781 m2)
Sendero - Ixtapaluca (180,647 m2)
Sendero - San Luis Potosí (137,979 m2)
Sendero - Toluca (189,384 m2)

Mérida, Yucatán 
The former Plaza Sendero in the Chuminópolis section of Mérida, Yucatán was taken over by Gran Patio management, and continues under the name "Patio Mérida".

Proposed and under construction

Los Cabos
Veracruz
Acapulco
Villahermosa
Apodaca
Tampico
Juárez
Ecatepec
Valladolid, Yucatán

References

Shopping malls in Mexico